Alexis Ayala (born David Alexis Ayala Padró on 9 August 1965) is an American-born Mexican actor of telenovelas and the cinema of Mexico.

Biography

Career
Ayala debuted as an actor at the age of 22 with the film En peligro de muerte ("In danger of death") and after completing his studies at the Centro de Educación Artística (CEA) of Televisa three years later he obtained a small role in Mi pequeña Soledad ("My little Soledad") with Verónica Castro.

In 1992, he appeared on Baila conmigo where he met Karla Álvarez, who he would later marry. Next year he obtained a more important role in the telenovela Los parientes pobres ("Poor Relatives"), a telenovela starred by singer Lucero. Both actors had shared the television screen in Cuando llega el amor ("When love arrives"). In 1999 he obtained his first starring role in Tres mujeres and with fellow actor and friend Sergio Mayer he produced the show Sólo para Mujeres where with Mayer and other celebrities they performed a strip-tease. 

The show was successful and, in spite of local opposition from Catholic groups, they took the show on tour all over Mexico. The show was later presented in other Latin American countries and the United States. Although he is no longer part of the ever-changing cast, as of 2005 he remains a producer of the show.

Filmography

Theater
 Sólo para Mujeres (1999) as himself Divorciemonos mi amor'' (2015) as Meliton

References

External links 
 Alexia Ayala at esmas.com
 

1965 births
Living people
American male actors of Mexican descent
Mexican male film actors
Mexican male telenovela actors
Male actors from San Francisco
American emigrants to Mexico